The Montana District is one of the 35 districts of the Lutheran Church–Missouri Synod (LCMS), and comprises the state of Montana. It also includes one congregation in Idaho and one congregation in North Dakota. The Montana District includes approximately 67 congregations and missions, subdivided into 6 circuits, as well as 18 preschools and 7 elementary schools. Baptized membership in district congregations is approximately 15,000, making it one of the two smallest districts along with the Wyoming District, which is roughly equal in size; a merger of the two districts was proposed in 2006.

The Montana District was formed in 1945 when the North Dakota and Montana District was divided, also creating the North Dakota District. District offices are located in Billings, Montana. Delegates from each congregation meet in convention every three years to elect the district president, vice presidents, circuit counselors, a board of directors, and other officers. The Rev. Terry Forke became the district president in September 2006.

Presidents
Rev. Paul M. Freiburger, 1945–1966
Rev. August F. Droegemueller, 1966–1969
Rev. George F. Wollenburg, 1969–1977
Rev. Harold V. Huber, 1977–1984 (died in office)
Rev. Albert G. Pullmann, 1984–1989
Rev. Richard Kiessling, 1989–1992
Rev. George F. Wollenburg, 1992–2006
Rev. Terry R. Forke, 2006–present

References

Archives, Concordia Historical Institute
Archives, The Montana District of the Lutheran Church - Missouri Synod

External links
Montana District web site
LCMS: Montana District
LCMS Congregation Directory
History of the LCMS in Montana
Concordia Historical Institute

Lutheran Church–Missouri Synod districts
Lutheranism in Idaho
Lutheranism in Montana
Lutheranism in North Dakota
Christian organizations established in 1945